Hakka Americans (客家美國人 or 客裔美國人), also called American Hakka, are Han people in the United States of Hakka origin, mostly from present-day Guangdong , Fujian, and Taiwan. Many Hakka Americans have connections to Hakka diaspora in Jamaica, the Caribbean, South East Asia, Latin America, and South America. The Han characters for Hakka literally mean "guest families". Unlike other Han ethnic groups, the Hakkas are not named after a geographical region, e.g. a province, county or city. The Hakkas usually identify with people who speak the Hakka language or share at least some Hakka ancestry. The earliest Hakka immigrants to what is now the United States mostly went to Hawaii, starting when the Kingdom of Hawaii was an independent sovereign state. After the lifting of the Chinese Exclusion Act by the passage of the Magnuson Act in 1943, the Hakka began to come to the US from Taiwan and to a lesser extent Hong Kong, Southeast Asia, Jamaica and the Caribbean.

Countries of Origin

Taiwan

The first wave of Taiwanese migration to the United States involved mostly post-World War II immigrants from the area now ruled by China (Waishengren), most of whom were not Hakka. Later, the other Taiwanese people, whose ancestors arrived in Taiwan before 1945, including many Hakkas, started immigrating in larger numbers after the 1960s.

It is estimated that there are currently over 20,000 Taiwanese Hakka in the United States.

Mainland China

Some Hakka Americans came from Meizhou (also called Kaying or Jiaying), Guangdong, China, or otherwise have ancestral roots in that area.

A small number of Hakka came to the continental US before the 1882 Chinese Exclusion Act. Some Hakka also went to Hawaii, where they consisted a significant minority of the population.

Jamaica

During the 1960s and 1970s, substantial migration of Jamaican Hakkas to the US and Canada occurred. Most Chinese Jamaicans are Hakka; they have a long history in Jamaica. Between 1854 and 1884, nearly 5000 Hakkas arrived in Jamaica in three major voyages, with some of them subsequently going to the United States. Many of these people also have African ancestry.

Distribution in the US

Hawaii

A significant minority of early Chinese immigrants to Hawaii, and even fewer to the Continental US, were Hakka, and much of the animosity between the Hakka and Punti Cantonese people carried over. In the first half of the 1800s, around 30 percent of Chinese in Hawaii were of Hakka, while only about 3 percent in the West Coast were Hakka. There was a communal ban on intermarriages between the two groups for the first generation of migrants. In the middle of the 19th century, Hakka immigrants in America were excluded from membership in the Chinese organizations.<ref>{{cite book|title=THE HAKKA ODYSSEY & THEIR TAIWAN HOMELAND |first=Clyde |last=Kiang}} </ref> The largest surge of immigration in that century occurred after an 1876 treaty between the US and Kingdom of Hawaii led to an increased need for labor.

Chinese revolutionary leader Sun Yat-sen lived in Hawaii for several years during his youth.

Organizations
Many organizations have been formed to promote Hakka culture in the US. One group is the New England Hakka Association, which reminds its members not to forget their roots. One example is a blog by Ying Han Brach called "Searching for My Hakka Roots". Another group is the Hakka Association of New York, which aims to promote Hakka culture across the five boroughs of New York City. In the mid 1970s, the Hakka Benevolent Association in San Francisco (San Francisco Jiaying Association) was founded by Tu Chung. The association has strong ties with the San Francisco community and offers scholarships to their young members. The most prominent association in Hawaii is the Tsung Tsin Association, which was founded in Honolulu in 1918 under the name Nin Fo Fui Kon. It provides scholarships to US citizens in Hawaii that are preferably of Hakka background and/or interested in the Hakka culture.

Languages
The American Community Survey reported that 1,350 people in the United States speak Hakka at home. The actual number may be much higher because some respondents just filled out their response as "Chinese". Some Hakka Americans speak Mandarin Chinese or Cantonese instead.

Cuisine
There are some restaurants in the U.S. serving Hakka cuisine. American food writer Linda Lau Anusasananan wrote a popular Hakka cookbook simply titled, The Hakka Cookbook'' (University of California Press, 2014).

Notable people

 Anya Ayoung-Chee (born 1981), Trinidadian fashion designer, model and television host
 Lisa Biagiotti (born 1979), filmmaker and journalist based in Los Angeles
 Shu-Park Chan (1929–2013), Chinese-born electrical engineer who served for many years as a professor at Santa Clara University and went on to found International Technological University and serve as its first president
 Steven N. S. Cheung (born 1935), Hong-Kong-born American economist who specializes in the fields of transaction costs and property rights
 Clive Chin (born 1954), Jamaican record producer
 Dennis Chin (1937–2003), soccer player
 Shawn Chin (born 1989), soccer player
 Vincent "Randy" Chin (1937–2003), Jamaican record producer and label owner who ran the Randy's shop
 David Chiu, (born 1970), American politician currently serving in the California State Assembly
 Ting-Chao Chou (born 1938), Hakka American theoretical biologist, pharmacologist, cancer researcher and inventor
 Lesley Ma (born 1980, Ma Wei-chung), younger daughter of Republic of China (Taiwan) President Ma Ying-jeou
 Mark Chung (born 1970), soccer player
 Supa Dups, born Dwayne Chin-Quee, Jamaican record producer, a drummer, and selector based in Miami, Florida 
 Goo Kim Fui (1835–1908) merchant, community leader, and philanthropist in Hawaii
 Kong Tai Heong (1875–1951), first female Hakka doctor in Hawaii
 MC Jin (born 1982), born Jin Au-Yeung, Hong Kong American rapper, songwriter
 Paula Williams Madison (born 1953), American journalist, writer, businessperson, and executive
 Carolyn Lei-Lanilau (born 1946), American poet and academic
 Li Tiejun (1904–2002), Kuomintang general 
 Liao Zhongkai (1877–1925), American-born, a Kuomintang leader, financier and assassination victim
 Cho-Liang Lin (born 1960), Taiwanese American violinist who is renowned for his appearances as a soloist with major orchestras
 Dyana Liu (born 1981), Taiwanese-born American actress
 Patrick Soon-Shiong (born 1952), South African surgeon, medical researcher, businessman, philanthropist, and professor at University of California at Los Angeles
 Sun Fo Sun Fo or Sun Ke ( 1891–1973), courtesy name Zhesheng, high-ranking official in the government of the Republic of China and the son of Sun Yat-sen, with his first wife Lu Muzhen.
 Nora Sun (1937–2011), Chinese American diplomat, businesswoman, and granddaughter of Sun Yat-sen
 Ching W. Tang (born 1947), Hong Kong-born American physical chemist
 Paul Tseng (1959–2009), Taiwanese-born American and Canadian applied mathematician and a professor at the Department of Mathematics at the University of Washington
 Joanna Wang, Taiwanese-American singer-songwriter, daughter of renowned music producer Wang Zhi-ping
 Lianxing Wen (born 1968), Chinese seismologist, geodynamicist and planetary scientist
 Shing-Tung Yau (born 1949), Chinese-born American mathematician. He was awarded the Fields Medal in 1982
 Yiaway Yeh (born 1978), former city councilmember and mayor of Palo Alto, California
 Amos Yong (born 1965), Asian American Pentecostal theologian
 Katherine Young (1901–2005), American centenarian and alleged oldest internet user
 Gene Yu, United States Military Academy graduate, former U.S. Army Special Forces officer and author, nephew of Ma Ying-jeou
 Patsy Yuen (born 1952), Jamaican costume designer and beauty queen
 Kane Kosugi

References

Bibliography
 

Chinese American